Wiggenhall St Mary Magdalen is a civil parish and village in the English county of Norfolk. For the purposes of local government, it falls within the district of King's Lynn and West Norfolk.

The villages name means 'Wicga's nook of land'.

In the Domesday Book of 1085, it appears that all two of the Wiggenhall parishes were at that time a single parish named Wiggenhall, of modest size and sharing half a water mill on the old Wiggenhall Eau (the watercourse which ran through the parish before the Great Ouse arrived in the 13th Century) with Runcton Holme.

The earliest evidence of settlement is therefore the parish church of St Mary Magdalen, which is situated in the very northeastern corner of the parish. Most of the early settlement appears to have occurred here, probably due to the presence of a levee along the western side of the River Great Ouse, made of silts deposited by a former watercourse, the Wiggenhall Eau.

The church itself is largely Perpendicular in style, but the tower may date from as early as the 13th century, which is corroborated by the entry in the Register of Crabhouse Priory which tells of the Nuns taking refuge at the Church from a flood in the early 13thC.  Today the church is almost entirely red brick, with a  façade that is the result of a thoroughly 15th century rebuilding.

The Parish contains two centres of population: around the Parish Church in the North, and to the South of Crabhouse Priory in the far South, now known as Stowbridge, which also extends into neighbouring parishes.

John Howard, 1st Duke of Norfolk, KG, Earl Marshal (c.1425 – 22 August 1485) was the grandson of Sir John Howard of Wiggenhall.

A tidal bore travels up the Great Ouse which is the area's most significant topographical feature.

Magdalen Gate railway station was the name of the station on the Great Eastern Railway.

Notable residents 
 Arthur Randell (1901-?), railwayman, molecatcher and author.

See also
Wiggenhall St Germans

Notes

External links

King's Lynn and West Norfolk
Villages in Norfolk
Civil parishes in Norfolk